is a Japanese voice actress from Osaka affiliated with the studio Aoni Production. She began her career in 1960 and has since starred in a number of voice-over roles for various anime, video games, films, and television commercials.

Works

Anime
Andersen Stories (Ugly Duckling)
Acrobunch (Miki Rando)
Adventures of Tom Sawyer (Other voices)
Ai no Gakko Cuore Monogatari (Nino)
Asari-chan Ai no Marchen Shōjo (Asari Hamano)
Calimero (Calimero)
Chie the Brat (Hirame Hirayama)
City Hunter 2 (Takeda Kimiko)
Mitsuo suwa (Perman)
Dororo (Ku Sukero)
Dr. Slump (Sparrow)
Dragon Ball (Boy)
Ge Ge Ge no Kitarō
Genie Family (Kan-chan's Grandmother)
Hell Girl (Momo)
Himitsu no Akko-chan (Admiral)
Hello, Hiroshi and Utako (Hiroshi)
Kaibutsu-kun (Hiroshi)
Kamui the Ninja (Riyuu Hutoshi)
Law of Ueki (Van)
Lupin III Part III (Julia) (episode 43)
Maeterlinck's Blue Bird (Other voices)
Mahō Tsukai ni Taisetsu na Koto: Natsu no Sora (Elderly woman) (episode 2)
Mirmo! (Harmo)
Moomin (Gaogao, Tofusu)
Nanako SOS (Dracula Boy)
Nils no Fushigi na Tabi (Nils' stopper)
Ninpu Kamui Gaiden (Ryuta)
Obake no Q-Taro (Shota Ohara)
One Piece (Lil) 
Pāman (Mitsuo, Pāman No. 1)
Patalliro! (Mary Jane)Someday's Dreamers (Old Woman, Grandmother)Superbook (Azusa aka "Joy" in the English version, Mrs. Asuka)Tiger Mask (Other voices)Tongari Bōshi no Memoru (Monica)Yu-Gi-Oh! (Mokuba Kaiba)

OVA
 Jigoku Sensei Nube (Other voices)
 Robot Carnival (Fukusuke)
 Space Journey: The First Dream of Wonder-kun (Wonder-kun)

Film
 Andersen Monogatari Match Uri no Shōjo (Mimi)
 Ge Ge Ge no Kitarō: Yōkai Daisensō Misuke in the Land of Ice (Nally)
 Phoenix 2772: Space Firebird (Olga)
 The Fantastic Adventures of Unico (Unico)
 Unico: To the Magic Island (Unico)
 Ushiro no Shomen Daare (Kayoko Nakane)

Foreign dub roles
Live-action
 Charlie and the Chocolate Factory (2008 NTV edition) (Veruca Salt (Julia Winter))

Animation
 DoDo, The Kid from Outer Space (DoDo)
 SWAT Kats: The Radical Squadron (Doctor Ann Sinian)
 Woody Woodpecker (Woody Woodpecker)

Video games
 Battle Fantasia (Watson Livingston)
 Ghost in the Shell (Fuchikoma)
 JoJo's Bizarre Adventure: All-Star Battle (Enya Geil)
 Pop'n Music 10 (Performer for the song "Come On Pāman")
 Super Magnetic Neo (Pinki)
 Tales of the World: Radiant Mythology 2'' (Panille)

References

External links
 Website at Aoni Production 
 
 

1943 births
Living people
Japanese voice actresses
Voice actresses from Osaka Prefecture
Voice actresses from Tokyo
Aoni Production voice actors